Johannes Kreidl (born 7 March 1996) is an Austrian professional footballer who plays as a goalkeeper for Veikkausliiga club KuPS.

Honours
Individual
Veikkausliiga Goalkeeper of the Year: 2021
Veikkausliiga Team of the Year: 2021, 2022

References

External links
 

1996 births
Living people
People from Schwaz District
Footballers from Tyrol (state)
Austrian footballers
Austria youth international footballers
Association football goalkeepers
Regionalliga players
Veikkausliiga players
2. Liga (Austria) players
Hamburger SV II players
Kuopion Palloseura players
1. FC Nürnberg II players
1. FC Nürnberg players
SV Ried players
Austrian expatriate footballers
Austrian expatriate sportspeople in Germany
Expatriate footballers in Germany
Austrian expatriate sportspeople in Finland
Expatriate footballers in Finland